Vaishnavi Macdonald (née Mahant) is an Indian film and TV actress who is best known for playing Geeta Viswas in Mukesh Khanna's television series Shaktimaan, telecasted on Doordarshan. She is currently seen in Dangal's recently launched Aye Mere Humsafar. She has acted in various Bollywood films such as Bambai Ka Babu, opposite Saif Ali Khan, Ladlaa and Barsaat Ki Raat (1998). She is also known for playing Shilpa Sharma in Miley Jab Hum Tum, Shail in the Zee TV show Sapne Suhane Ladakpan Ke and Leela Taneja in the television series Tashan-E-Ishq.

Early life and career 

Her father is a Vaishnav Hindu (the reason she took the screen name Vaishnavi).

As a child she moved to Hyderabad where she decided to become a scientist. However, while vacationing in Mumbai, she had the opportunity to appear in the Ramsay Brothers' horror film Veerana and decided to pursue acting as a profession. She subsequently appeared in Barsaat Ki Raat, Ladlaa, Maidan-E-Jung, Bambai Ka Babu, Daanveer and Oru Mutham Manimutham  (a 1997 Malayalam film with actor Mukesh).

From 1998 to 2005, she played the female lead Geeta Vishwas in the superhero series Shaktimaan on Doordarshan. The show, as well as her character, got high acclaim and was considered her breakthrough role. When her journalist character Geeta Vishwas was written out of the series, fan protests prompted the producers to bring her back. In 2000, she played the role of ACP Ratna, a daring police officer in the comedy serial Raju Raja Rajasaab on Sahara TV.

She went on to play leading roles in several Telugu films.

She played the role of Sameera's mother Sapna in Chhoona Hai Aasmaan and Bhaskar's mother in the Sony Entertainment Television serial Bhaskar Bharti. She also appeared in Karmyudh on Doordarshan in the role of Inspector Shivangi Chauhan.

She is married to Leslie Macdonald and has a daughter.

Filmography

Films

Television

Publications 

 Macdonald, Vaishnavi. The Invisible Hand of God.  .
 Macdonald, Vaishnavi. The Cinderella Effect: Nothing Here is Forever. Pen It! Publications, LLC. .

Awards

References

External links 
 
 

Living people
Actresses from Mumbai
Actresses from Hyderabad, India
Indian film actresses
Indian television actresses
Actresses in Hindi cinema
Actresses in Malayalam cinema
Actresses in Kannada cinema
Actresses in Hindi television
Indian Christians
Year of birth missing (living people)
20th-century Indian actresses
21st-century Indian actresses